A moment (momentum) is a medieval unit of time. The movement of a shadow on a sundial covered 40 moments in a solar hour, a twelfth of the period between sunrise and sunset. The length of a solar hour depended on the length of the day, which, in turn, varied with the season. Although the length of a moment in modern seconds was therefore not fixed, on average, a moment corresponded to 90 seconds. A solar day can be divided into 24 hours of either equal or unequal lengths, the former being called natural or equinoctial, and the latter artificial. The hour was divided into 4 puncti (quarter-hours), 10 minuta, or 40 momenta.

The unit was used by medieval computists before the introduction of the mechanical clock and the base 60 system in the late 13th century. The unit would not have been used in everyday life. For medieval commoners the main marker of the passage of time was the call to prayer at intervals throughout the day.

The earliest reference found to the moment is from the 8th century writings of the Venerable Bede, who describes the system as 1 solar hour = 4 puncti = 5 lunar puncti = 10 minuta = 15 partes = 40 momenta. Bede was referenced five centuries later by both Bartholomeus Anglicus in his early encyclopedia De Proprietatibus Rerum (On the Properties of Things), as well as Roger Bacon, by which time the moment was further subdivided into 12 ounces of 47 atoms each, although no such divisions could ever have been used in observation with equipment in use at the time.

References

Units of time

zh:时刻